Phipun is a district (amphoe) in the northern part of Nakhon Si Thammarat province, southern Thailand.

Geography
Neighboring districts are (from the northeast clockwise): Nopphitam, Phrom Khiri, Lan Saka, and Chawang of Nakhon Si Thammarat Province; Wiang Sa and Ban Na San of Surat Thani province.

History
The minor district (king amphoe) was created on 1 September 1972, when the two tambons Phipun and Kathun were split off from Chawang district. It was upgraded to a full district on 8 September 1976.

Administration
The district is divided into five sub-districts (tambons), which are further subdivided into 43 villages (mubans). Phibun is a township (thesaban tambon) covering parts of tambon Phibun. There are a further five tambon administrative organizations (TAO).

References

External links
amphoe.com (Thai)
http://www.phipun.com Website of district (Thai)

Districts of Nakhon Si Thammarat province